The Men's triple jump at the 2014 Commonwealth Games as part of the athletics programme took place at Hampden Park on 1 and 2 August 2014.

Results

Qualifying round

Final

References

Men's triple jump
2014